Uvis Jānis Balinskis (born 1 August 1996) is a Latvian professional ice hockey defenceman currently playing for HC Verva Litvínov of the Czech Extraliga.

He participated at the 2017 IIHF World Championship, 2018 IIHF World Championship and 2019 IIHF World Championship.

Career statistics

Regular season and playoffs

International

References

External links

1996 births
Living people
Latvian ice hockey defencemen
People from Ventspils
Dinamo Riga players
HK Riga players
HK Liepājas Metalurgs players
HC Litvínov players
Ice hockey players at the 2022 Winter Olympics
Olympic ice hockey players of Latvia
Augsburger Panther players
HC Bílí Tygři Liberec players
Latvian expatriate sportspeople in the Czech Republic
Latvian expatriate sportspeople in Germany